The Silver Line is a  heritage streetcar line operated by the San Diego Trolley, an operating division of the San Diego Metropolitan Transit System. It currently operates the "downtown loop"; a circle of tracks around Downtown San Diego, and is operated using renovated historic vehicles. The line is also known as the SDG&E Silver Line after San Diego Gas & Electric (SDG&E), which has provided grants to help restore the streetcars and also sponsors a 3rd-grade history curriculum that includes free rides on the line. The line is one of four lines in the Trolley system; the others include the Blue, Orange, and Green lines.

History
The Silver Line is the fourth line in the San Diego Trolley system as well as the first circular route with service beginning in 2011. Planning for the Silver Line dates back to the early 1990s, upon the completion of the Downtown Loop, consideration was given to providing a downtown trolley service that circles around the loop. MTS (then MTDB) originally considered using three Vienna Class N1 cars formerly used on the Stadtbahn in the Austrian city of Vienna, but their age and limited power proved incompatible with the present trolley system, and renovations to make them so were considered unfeasible.

Eventually, in 2005, MTS would settle on using PCC streetcars, which were formerly used by the San Diego Electric Railway, San Diego's former transit service, in the 1930s and 40s. Between 2005 and 2010, MTS acquired six PCC streetcars formerly used in San Francisco and Philadelphia, and would partner with the San Diego historic streetcar society, a non-profit organization developed to educate the public of the history of the San Diego Electric Railway, to help restore these streetcars for use on the eventual line.

In early 2011 the first of these streetcars, Car 529, was completed and the inauguration of the Silver Line was held on August 27, 2011. Restoring this car for use in the trolley system required over 3,000 volunteer hours and $850,000 in donations. For the first two weeks of the vintage trolley's run, riders who boarded at the 12th & Imperial Transit Center received "commemorative tickets" to use for boarding the trolley. Due to the limited amount of streetcars, initial service for the line was limited to weekends and holidays every 30 minutes between the hours of 10 am to 2 pm. On December 20, 2011, service was expanded to Tuesdays and Thursdays from 10 am to 2 pm as well as weekends and holidays from 11 am to 3:30 pm. It was expected that more service hours will be added upon the completion of additional streetcars.

In 2015, the line was renamed the SDG&E Silver Line after San Diego Gas & Electric (SDG&E) provided a grant to help restore streetcar number 530. The utility company also sponsors a 3rd-grade history curriculum that includes free rides on the line.

From April 12, 2020 until July 2021, all Silver line operations were suspended after five bus operators ended up testing positive for COVID-19. The Silver Line returned for public service on Saturdays and Sundays on July 3, 2021 after more than a year of non-operation.

Operations
Due to the limited amount of streetcars, service for the line  only operates every 30 minutes on weekends and select holidays from 9:07 am (pull out) and 6:32 pm (pull in).

Ridership
Due to its limited days and hours of operation, and due to some service interruptions throughout 2014, the Silver Line transported just 29,104 riders during FY 2014. In FY 2015, 32,944 riders rode the Silver Line according to the MTS.

Stations

As the heritage PCC streetcars are single-ended, the Silver Line operates one-way in a clockwise-only rotation around downtown San Diego.

Rolling stock
The Silver Line began service in August 2011 with one operational heritage 1946 Presidents Conference Committee (PCC) streetcar, Car #529. The vehicle also had pantograph current collection equipment added, as the overhead power lines that MTS operates is not compatible with trolley poles that the PCC streetcars were originally equipped with. The car retained its trolley poles, however, for visual effect.

In March 2014, MTS took possession of a second 1946 Presidents Conference Committee (PCC) streetcar, destined to join the Silver Line fleet as Car #530. Restoration work on this trolley car, aided by a grant from San Diego Gas & Electric, took one year, and Car #530 entered service on the Silver Line on March 2, 2015, as part of the centennial celebrations for Balboa Park.

The first San Diego Trolley vehicle, Siemens–Duewag U2 unit 1001, has also been restored for use on the Silver Line. It was unveiled on July 11, 2019.

Additional streetcars

MTS had longer-term plans to restore an additional five PCC streetcars to expand heritage streetcar service operations. Car #531, a former SEPTA PCC manufactured in 1948, has also been funded for restoration at the MTS PCC shop, but has not made its debut on the line yet. It is yet to be announced if these streetcars will be restored for service operations.

Future

One of the future proposals for trolley expansion is to potentially extend the Silver Line from Downtown up towards Balboa Park and the Uptown communities. MTS began work in March 2011 on a study to evaluate the feasibility of reconnecting Balboa Park, the San Diego Zoo and Downtown San Diego through a fixed-guideway, electrified  streetcar line. The project study corridor runs between the City College Trolley Station area, and Balboa Park, in the vicinity of the San Diego Zoo. An alignment similar to the proposed one was last served by a streetcar system in 1949 on Line 7 (Park Boulevard-University Avenue to East San Diego) & Line 11 (Park Boulevard-Adams Avenue to Kensington). 

In October 2012, MTS released a study to evaluate the feasibility of reconnecting Balboa Park and downtown San Diego via an electrified streetcar corridor. The main issue is crossing the I-5 highway. There is insufficient space between the north-south lanes of Park Boulevard to insert two tracks, and the existing structure is not strong enough to bear the weight of a full LRV were the line extended further north into the high traffic Hillcrest area. So, there are significant construction/cost/expansion concerns. 

This study was the first step in the process to construct such a project. An initial timeline offered in the study for the project's completion was 5 years. Since October 2012, no further action has been taken.

References

External links

San Diego Vintage Trolley website
San Diego Electric Railway Association website

Railway lines opened in 2011
San Diego Trolley lines
 
Heritage streetcar systems
Heritage railroads in California
Streetcars in California